Guilherme Rau (?–1953) immigrated to Santa Maria, Rio Grande do Sul, Brazil from Germany in 1900. An ophthalmologist, from 1915 to 1917 he helped with the Geological Survey of Berlin's excavation of 200 fossil at the Paleontological Site Sanga of Alemoa. He also contributed considerably to the Geopark of Paleorrota and taught Botany at the Faculty of Pharmacy of the city in the years 1934 and 1935.

References
 Os Répteis do Rio Grande do Sul. Author : Thales de Lema. (Portuguese).
 Book Os Fascinantes Caminhos da Paleontologia. Author : Antônio Isaia. Publisher Pallotti. (Portuguese)
 Book: "Cronologia Histórica de Santa Maria e do extinto município de São Martinho." 1787–1933. Vol I. Author: Romeu Beltrão, Publisher Pallotti, 1958. (Portuguese)

Brazilian paleontologists
Year of birth missing
1953 deaths
German emigrants to Brazil
Brazilian ophthalmologists